Yagli (foaled in 1993 in Kentucky) is a retired American Thoroughbred racehorse. He was bred and raced by prominent horseman and CEO of Gulfstream Aerospace Allen Paulson, who also owned U.S. Racing Hall of Fame inductee, Cigar, European Horse of the Year and winner of the 1991 Breeders' Cup Juvenile Arazi, as well as 2002 American Horse of the Year Azeri, among others.

A colt who developed late, Yagli began racing at age three but did not meet with much success until age five in 1998 when he won three Graded stakes races including the Hialeah Turf Cup Handicap and finished second in the Breeders' Cup Turf. The following year, he won three Grade I races at age six in 1999.

Paulson died in July 2000, and Yagli was sold by the estate to a stud farm in Brazil.

References

External Links 
 Yagli's pedigree and partial racing stats

1993 racehorse births
Thoroughbred family 8-f
Racehorses bred in Kentucky
Racehorses trained in the United States